North Star Bay, also known as Thule Harbor and Wolstenholme Bay, is a bay off the mouth of Wolstenholme Fjord, Greenland.

The bay is named after HMS North Star. Thule Air Base is located at the edge of the bay. There are two large islands in the bay, Saunders Island and Wolstenholme Island. The channel to the south, between Saunders Island and the mainland is known as Bylot Sound.

History
The abandoned Inuit settlements of Narsaarsuk and Pituffik were located at the edge of the bay.

In 1849 under Commander James Saunders the North Star sailed to the Arctic in the spring on an expedition to search and resupply Captain Sir James Clark Ross' venture, who in turn had sailed in 1848 trying to locate the whereabouts of Sir John Franklin's expedition.

Failing to find Franklin or Ross, Saunders's mission aboard North Star consisted in depositing stores along several named areas of the Canadian Arctic coast and returning to England before the onset of winter. However, James Saunders's ship progress northwards was hindered by ice in Melville Bay and the ship became trapped by ice off the coast of NW Greenland in North Star Bay. A paper left by Saunders in a cairn reads thus: 

During the winter 1849–50 Saunders named numerous landmarks in that area while wintering in the frozen bay.

The bay was the site of a Cold War nuclear accident when a B-52 bomber carrying four thermonuclear bombs crashed, spreading contaminated material over the area.

Images

References

Bays of Greenland